Jo Yong-won (born 1957) is a North Korean politician and a deputy chief of the Workers' Party of Korea (WPK)'s Secretariat of General Secretary Kim Jong-un. He was a vice director of the WPK Organization and Guidance Department (OGD). Jo was also a full member of the 7th Central Committee of the WPK since it was elected at the 7th Congress of the WPK in May 2016. Jo has been a member of the Presidium of the Politburo, and a secretary of the Secretariat of the WPK since it was elected at the 8th WPK Central Committee in January 2021. Jo appears to serve as the First Secretary of the Workers’ Party of Korea making him formally the principal day-to-day leader of the party second only to Kim Jong-un.

Jo is a confidant of the country's leader, Kim Jong-un, and accompanies him often on guidance tours, mostly in relation to economy. In 2016 he was the most frequent member of Kim's entourage. 

According to NK News, Jo was "once described as a 'rising star' of DPRK politics [and] remains one of the country's most important officials." Jo is often featured in North Korean media; in 2018 his name was mentioned more often than that of any other official except Kim Jong-un.

In March 2021 in Pyongyang, Jo "sharply censured the shortcomings" of WPK city and county level cadre, calling out their "deviations of failing to properly apply our Party's people-first politics."

Sanctions and travel ban 
In January 2017, the United States Department of the Treasury sanctioned Jo for his involvement in the censorship activities of the OGD. In June 2017, Jo was singled out in Annex 1 of United Nations Security Council Resolution 2356, which placed an international travel ban and asset freeze on him.

See also
 Politics of North Korea

References

Living people
1957 births
North Korean politicians
Date of birth missing (living people)
Place of birth missing (living people)
Members of the 8th Presidium of the Workers' Party of Korea
Alternate members of the 7th Politburo of the Workers' Party of Korea